Stephen Junius Wright, Jr. (September 8, 1910 – April 16, 1996) was an American academic administrator. He served as the seventh president of Fisk University, a historically black university in Nashville, Tennessee, from 1957 to 1966. He was also the president of the United Negro College Fund. In 1960, Wright served on a committee chaired by Madison Sarratt to put an end to the Nashville sit-ins. 

Wright served on the National Commission for Libraries appointed by President Lyndon B. Johnson.

References

1910 births
1996 deaths
Hampton University alumni
Howard University alumni
New York University alumni
Presidents of Fisk University
People from Dillon, South Carolina
African-American academics
20th-century African-American people
20th-century American academics